Gene Jeter (born February 9, 1942) is a former American football linebacker. He played for the Denver Broncos from 1965 to 1967.

References

1942 births
Living people
American football linebackers
Arkansas–Pine Bluff Golden Lions football players
Texas Southern Tigers football players
Denver Broncos players